Taiping is a town in Daoli District, Harbin, Heilongjiang province, China. , it administers Taiping Residential Community and the following nine villages:
Taiping Village
Yonghe Village
Xianfa Village
Tai'an Village
Ligong Village
Liquan Village
Qianjin Village
Xianfu Village
Liye Village

References

Township-level divisions of Heilongjiang
Harbin